Pasture Point Historic District is a national historic district located at Hampton, Virginia. The district encompasses 110 contributing buildings in a streetcar suburb of Hampton platted in 1885.  The residences include notable examples of the Late Victorian, Prairie School, and Bungalow styles.  The district was largely developed by 1919, with some later infill dwellings.

It was listed on the National Register of Historic Places in 2012.

References

Houses on the National Register of Historic Places in Virginia
National Register of Historic Places in Hampton, Virginia
Victorian architecture in Virginia
Historic districts on the National Register of Historic Places in Virginia
Houses in Hampton, Virginia